The 2009 SEC softball tournament will be held at Sherri Parker Lee Softball Stadium on the campus of the University of Tennessee in Knoxville, Tennessee, on May 7 through May 9, 2009.  The Florida Gators won the 2008 tournament and are the 2009 regular season conference champion. The Florida Gators received the conference's automatic bid to the 2009 NCAA Division I softball tournament by winning the conference tournament.

Tournament

See also
Women's College World Series
NCAA Division I Softball Championship
SEC softball tournament
SEC tournament

External links
2009 SEC softball tournament - SECSports.com

References

SEC softball tournament
2009 Southeastern Conference softball season